The Canton of Vieux-Habitants (French for Old Inhabitants) is a canton in the Arrondissement of Basse-Terre on the island of Guadeloupe.

Municipalities
Since the French canton reorganisation which came into effect in March 2015, the communes of the canton are:
Baillif
Bouillante (partly)
Vieux-Habitants

See also
Cantons of Guadeloupe
Communes of Guadeloupe
Arrondissements of Guadeloupe

References

Cantons of Guadeloupe